Fallgate railway station co-served the village of Milltown, Derbyshire, England, from 1925 to 1936 on the Ashover Light Railway.

History 
The station was opened on 7 April 1925 by the Ashover Light Railway. It closed on 14 September 1936.

References 

Disused railway stations in Derbyshire
Railway stations in Great Britain opened in 1925
Railway stations in Great Britain closed in 1936
1925 establishments in England
1936 disestablishments in England